William Currie (September 21, 1862 – May 30, 1934) was a manufacturer and political figure in New Brunswick, Canada. He represented Restigouche County in the Legislative Assembly of New Brunswick from 1908 to 1912 and from 1917 to 1920 as a Liberal member.

He was born in Upper Charlo, New Brunswick, the son of Ronald Currie and Margaret McCurdy. In 1890, he married Marie Murray. He was named speaker for the provincial assembly in 1917 but resigned that post. He lived in Campbellton. Currie was a member of the Masonic Lodge.

He died May 30, 1934 of heart disease.

References 

 Canadian Parliamentary Guide, 1920, EJ Chambers

1862 births
1934 deaths
New Brunswick Liberal Association MLAs
Speakers of the Legislative Assembly of New Brunswick
Canadian Presbyterians
People from Restigouche County, New Brunswick